McGraths Hill is a suburb of Sydney, in the state of New South Wales, Australia. It is located 53 kilometres north-west of the Sydney central business district in the local government area of the City of Hawkesbury. It is bounded in the north-west by South Creek, shortly before it enters the Hawkesbury River. It is named after James McGrath, an Irish convict transported to Australia aboard the Hercules in 1802, who purchased property in the area around 1813.

References

Suburbs of Sydney
City of Hawkesbury
Hawkesbury River